The Countryside and Rights of Way Act 2000 (c. 37), known informally as the CRoW Act or "Right to Roam" Act is a United Kingdom Act of Parliament affecting England and Wales which came into force on 30 November 2000.

Right to roam
The Act implements the so-called "right to roam" (also known as jus spatiandi) long sought by the Ramblers' Association and its predecessors, on certain upland and uncultivated areas of England and Wales. This element of the act was implemented in stages as conclusive maps of different regions were produced. The act refers to areas of 'mountain, moor, heath and down' in addition to registered common land; not all uncultivated land is covered.

Rights of way
A staged review of public rights of way, including limited rights to create new public footpaths where needed, is being conducted under the Act. Again, this is being conducted in a staged manner, which can produce anomalies – of the two administrative areas of the County of Gloucestershire, South Gloucestershire was revised in the Southern area and the rest of Gloucestershire in the Midlands.

Some long-standing areas of dispute became accessible under the Act – these include Chrome Hill and Parkhouse Hill in the Peak District.

Nature conservation
The Countryside and Rights of Way Act also made some changes in respect of nature conservation, in particular to Part I of the Wildlife and Countryside Act 1981. The three main changes are: the maximum penalty is now a term of imprisonment instead of a fine; the Secretary of State can designate "wildlife inspectors" who have a range of powers under the Act; offences of disturbing certain birds and animals are extended so as to cover reckless as well as intentional acts.

The act gave power to create local access forums (commonly referred to as 'LAFs'), comprising a balance of user, landowner and other interests, to give advice on development of access land and of the path network; the policy of footpath improvement would be set out in a Rights of Way Improvement Plan (RoWIP).

Scotland
A more extensive Land Reform (Scotland) Act 2003 was enacted by the Scottish Parliament which formalised the Scottish tradition of unhindered access to open countryside, provided that care is taken not to cause damage or interfere with activities including farming and game stalking.

See also
English land law
Freedom to roam
Open Country – UK usage
Rights of way in England and Wales

External links

United Kingdom Acts of Parliament 2000
Walking in the United Kingdom
Land law
Freedom to roam
Acts of the Parliament of the United Kingdom concerning England and Wales
2000 in England
2000 in Wales